Şehitkamil is a district of Gaziantep Province of Turkey. It is part of Gaziantep Metropolitan Municipality.  It contains the old city, including Gaziantep Castle, as well as the University of Gaziantep. The population is 593,958 as of 2010. On 20 August 2012, a bomb attack occurred, killing at least eight and wounding nearly 64 people. Şehitkamil was the epicenter of the 7.8 2023 Turkey–Syria earthquake, which heavily damaged the district, including its landmarks.

See also
Gazikentspor, women's football team promoted to the Turkish Women's First Football League for the 2014–15 season.

References

Districts of Gaziantep Province